Keep On Loving You is the twenty-seventh studio album by American country music singer Reba McEntire. It was released August 18, 2009 on Starstruck/Valory and on Humphead Records in the UK, and was produced by Tony Brown, Mark Bright, and McEntire.

Keep On Loving You is McEntire's first solo studio album in six years, since the release of 2003's Room to Breathe and her first for the Valory label (in conjunction with her company, Starstruck Entertainment). In 2008, she exited her label of twenty five years, MCA Nashville after the release of Reba: Duets (2007). The album contains "Strange," which is the highest-debuting single of McEntire's career, as well as the hit single "Consider Me Gone," McEntire's first Number One hit since "Somebody" in August 2004. The song also went on to become the biggest hit of her career, topping the charts for four weeks. The album's third single, the Ronnie Dunn co-written title track, was released in February 2010 and has become a Top Ten hit on the country charts.

Despite changing labels, McEntire remains with Universal Music Group (which controls her entire catalog including her Mercury Nashville years), as Valory's parent label, Big Machine Records, is distributed by Universal.

Background 
Keep On Loving You was recorded in Nashville, Tennessee in early 2009 and consists of thirteen tracks.  The eighth track, "She's Turning 50 Today" was co-written by McEntire herself, as well as Liz Hengber and Tommy Lee James. Many of the album's songs had previously been recorded by other country music artists. "I Want a Cowboy", was originally recorded by Katrina Elam on her self-titled debut album and "Pink Guitar" was recorded by Jasmine Rae on her debut album Look It Up. "Eight Crazy Hours" was recorded by Shelly Fairchild on her debut album Ride, and "Nothing to Lose" was recorded by Trisha Yearwood in 2007 on her Greatest Hits release. The title track was later recorded by co-writer Ronnie Dunn on the Cracker Barrel edition of his self-titled debut album in 2012.

Critical reception

Thom Jurek of Allmusic praised the album's production, saying, "Despite its release on an indie, the production and approach are anything but, with the album being produced by Tony Brown and Mark Bright. The cream of country music's current chart crop wrote its 13 songs; it is certainly a radio-friendly collection that is supposed to showcase McEntire's adaptability and that she's still "got it," and can still score in the contemporary marketplace."  Thom Jurek also found Keep On Loving You to radio friendly, calling the title track, "I'll Keep on Lovin' You" be "a midtempo ballad that is saturated in compressed guitars and Hammond B-3, big repetitive choruses, and a chorus of fiddles and backing vocals. McEntire's voice hasn't lost even a touch of its range and power; she's a belter who can hang with the best of them." He also felt the opening track, "Strange" to follow the same format.  He gave Keep On Loving You three out of five stars. In concluding his review, Jurek said; "The bottom line here is that Keep on Loving You may jar some longtime Reba fans on first listen, but despite the record's sound it's all her in this mix, and they will more than likely celebrate this. As far as the new fans this set clearly hopes to gain, it's got the right elements; if country music's finicky youth-obsessed radio and video machine can hear this set for what it is, listeners will connect in droves."

Bobby Peacock of Roughstock also gave a generally positive review, saying that some songs such as "Consider Me Gone", the second single, recalled her early-1990s work. He criticized the lyrics and "sometimes-sterile production" of some songs but added, "Despite the flaws, the album has more than enough redeeming qualities, and with any luck, the right single choices should reverse the long, slow decline that her musical career has been on since the beginning of the decade, and prove that age should not be a factor in an artist's success."

Whitney Pastorek of Entertainment Weekly gave Keep On Loving You a "B−" rating, stating, "Though her voice has aged well, few of these tunes  provide it enough of a challenge, and the ones that do often sound like something she's already done better."

Commercial performance
The album's lead single, "Strange" was released April 6, 2009 to radio and was first performed at the Academy of Country Music Awards a few days before. The song became McEntire's highest-debuting single of her career, debuting at #39 on the Billboard Hot Country Songs chart. Within a week, the song rose eleven spaces to #28, eventually peaking at #11 on the chart by summer 2009, while also reaching #10 on the Mediabase country chart around the same time. McEntire released the album's second single, "Consider Me Gone," to radio the day of the album's official release. Keep On Loving You was released August 18, 2009, becoming McEntire's second album to debut at #1 on both the Billboard Top Country Albums and Billboard 200 charts, with 96,000 copies sold its first week. This is lower than the 300,000 first-week sales for her album Reba: Duets. With the release, McEntire currently holds the record for being the female country artist with the most Billboard #1 albums. The record had previously been held by Loretta Lynn. It was certified Gold by the Recording Industry Association of America.

Worldwide the album was fairly successful peaking at #16 on the ARIA, #5 on the UK Country Album Charts, and #98 on the Japan Oricon Top 100.

Track listing

Personnel

Musicians 
 Reba McEntire – lead vocals
 Charlie Judge – keyboards, strings
 Gordon Mote – acoustic piano
 Steve Nathan – keyboards, Hammond B3 organ
 Matt Rollings – acoustic piano, Hammond B3 organ
 Jimmie Lee Sloas – acoustic guitar, bass guitar
 Bryan Sutton – acoustic guitar, banjo
 Ilya Toshinsky – acoustic guitar, banjo
 Tom Bukovac – electric guitar
 Kenny Greenberg – electric guitar
  Brent Mason – electric guitar
 Paul Franklin – dobro, steel guitar
 Mike Johnson – dobro, steel guitar
 Aubrey Haynie – fiddle, mandolin
 Glenn Worf – bass guitar
 Eddie Bayers – drums
 Shannon Forrest – drums
 Ashley Cleveland – backing vocals
 Perry Coleman – backing vocals
 Katrina Elam – backing vocals
 Wes Hightower – backing vocals
 Kim Keyes – backing vocals
 Wayne Kirkpatrick – backing vocals
 Jason Sellers – backing vocals
 Judson Spence – backing vocals
 Jenifer Wrinkle – backing vocals

Production notes 
 Mark Bright – producer 
 Tony Brown – producer 
 Reba McEntire – producer 
 Derek Bason – engineer, mixing
 Steve Marcantionio – engineer
 Todd Tidwell – engineer
 Chris Ashburn – assistant engineer
 Nathan Dickinson – digital editing
 Hank Williams – mastering
 Tristan Brock-Jones – production assistant
 Kirsten Wines – production assistant
 Mike "Frog" Griffith – production coordination
 Erin McAnally – production coordination
 Whitney Sutton – copy coordination
 Todd Cassetty – art direction, design
 Russ Harrington – photography
 Terry Gordon – stylist
 Trey Fanjoy – director

Charts and certifications

Weekly charts

Year-end charts

Singles

Release history

References 

2009 albums
Reba McEntire albums
Big Machine Records albums
Albums produced by Tony Brown (record producer)
Albums produced by Mark Bright (record producer)